Pedro Eugenio Aramburu Silveti (May 21, 1903 – June 1, 1970) was an Argentine Army general. He was a major figure behind the Revolución Libertadora, the military coup against Juan Perón in 1955. He became dictator of Argentina, serving from November 13, 1955 to May 1, 1958. He was kidnapped by the radical organization Montoneros on May 29, 1970 and murdered, allegedly in retaliation for the June 1956 execution of General Juan José Valle, an army officer associated with the Peronist movement, and 26 Peronist militants after a botched attempt to overthrow his regime.

Military career
He studied at the National Military College
1922: Sub-lieutenant
1939: Major
1943: Teacher in the Escuela de Guerra
1951: Brigadier
Director of the Escuela de Guerra
1955: Commander in Chief of the Army
1958: Lieutenant general.

President of Argentina
He served as de facto president of Argentina from November 13th 1955 to May 1st 1958.

The Revolución Libertadora which overthrew Juan Perón was triggered in part by his actions towards the press, as well as the imprisonment of opposition leaders and economic instability. For example, Perón incited his followers to wreck the offices and printing presses of newspapers who criticized him and he jailed the leader of the opposition, Ricardo Balbin, of the Radical Civic Union party.<ref>On Perón's incitement of his followers to violence against the press and his treatment of opposition leaders see Leslie E. Anderson, Social Capital in Developing Democracies:  Nicaragua and Argentina Compared, New York, Cambridge University Press, 2010 esp Chap 3 and Susan and Peter Calvert, Argentina:  Political Culture and Instability, Pittsburgh, PA:  University of Pittsburgh Press, 1989. Perón also undermined opposition voices from within his own party and tried to eliminate anyone who disagreed with him and might be a competitor for power within Peronism. On Perón's treatment of the opposition inside Peronism see Raanan Rein, In the Shadow of Perón:  Juan Atilio Bramuglia and the Second Line of Argentinas Populist Movement, Translated by Martha Grenzeback, Stanford, CA:  Stanford University Press, 2008.  Originally published as Juan Atilio Bramuglia:  Bajo la sombra del Lider.  La segunda linea del liderazgo peronista (Buenos Aires: Ediciones Lumiere, 2006).</ref>  The military Revolución Libertadora against Perón for these actions led to three years of military rule under Aramburu, who allowed elections to be held in 1958.

Aramburu's military government forced Perón into exile and barred the Peronist Party from further elections. Perón lived in exile in Spain until 1973.

He repealed the reelectionist and statist Constitution of 1949 and restored the validity of the historical text of 1853/60, a decision that was later validated by a constituent convention. He promised to hand over power as soon as possible to a president elected by the people. He made a public commitment that none of the military who held positions in his government would accept candidacies when elections were called.

 Anti-Peronist political power 
After the end of his presidential term in 1958, Aramburu retired from the military career and devoted himself entirely to politics.

He ran for president in 1963 as leader of the Union of the Argentine People (Union del Pueblo Argentino, UDELPA), with the slogan "Vote UDELPA and HE won't return" ("Vote UDELPA y no vuelve"), referring to Perón.

With the Peronists banned, the Presidential elections  resulted in Arturo Umberto Illia becoming president, with Aramburu coming in third.

Yet the military retained much real power, censoring both Peronism and its leader. The fragility of Argentine democracy was shown when Illia was overthrown in 1966 by a military coup led by General Juan Carlos Onganía.

In 1970, Aramburu was mentioned as a possible presidential candidate.

 Death 
On May 29, 1970 at noon, Aramburu was snatched from his apartment in Buenos Aires by two members of Montoneros posing as young army officers. Montoneros dubbed the kidnapping Operación Pindapoy'', after a company that produced citrus in the 1960s. Aramburu's disappearance kept Argentinian society on tenterhooks for a month before it was discovered that Aramburu had been murdered three days after his abduction, following a mock trial and his corpse hidden inside a farmhouse near Timote, Carlos Tejedor, in Buenos Aires Province. He had been shot twice in the chest with two different pistols. Following his arrest, convicted terrorist Mario Firmenich took credit for the kidnapping and assassination.

In the following weeks, statements from Montoneros flooded the media. Among other things, they claimed their actions were a response to the executions of twenty-seven Peronist militants who took part in an unsuccessful coup d'état in 1956. 

In 1974, Aramburu's body was stolen by Montoneros. The corpse was to be held until President Isabel Perón brought back Eva Perón's body from Italy. It was also an act of revenge for the previous removal of Evita's body. Once Evita's body arrived in Argentina, Montoneros gave up Aramburu's corpse and abandoned it in a street in Buenos Aires.

Legacy 
Following his abduction and murder, Aramburu became a martyr for the anti-Peronist movement in Argentina. For Peronists, on the other hand, Aramburu's assassination was a dream came true, and was considered valid act of retaliation for the executions of Juan José Valle and Raul Tanco after their failed uprising against the Revolución Libertadora.

See also 
History of Argentina
List of solved missing person cases

References

External links
Ejército Argentino (Spanish)
Some speeches of Aramburu
Information about Presidents of Argentina (Spanish)
Braden vs Peron confrontation (Spanish)
 The official notices from Montoneros (Spanish)
 Find-A-Grave profile for Pedro Eugenio Aramburu

1903 births
1970 deaths
Argentine people of Basque descent
Burials at La Recoleta Cemetery
People from Río Cuarto, Córdoba
Presidents of Argentina
Argentine generals
Argentine anti-communists
Assassinated Argentine politicians
Deaths by firearm in Argentina
Kidnapped Argentine people
People murdered in Argentina
Leaders who took power by coup
Terrorism deaths in Argentina
Colegio Militar de la Nación alumni
Kidnappings in Argentina
Victims of body snatching